Memorial Rock is a  boulder on State Highway 145 (SH 145) near Dolores in the US state of Colorado.

Rockfall
Rockfall, caused by ice jacking  during freeze-thaw cycles in the Rocky Mountains, is cited as a "chronic hazard" at over 750 locations by the Colorado Department of Transportation (CDOT). On May 24, 2019, a  rockfall from a  mountain ledge occurred at milepost 22 of SH 145 near Dolores, completely covering and closing the highway. The largest rock in the rockfall left an  trench behind it.

Designation as landmark
When it was deemed impractical to remove or destroy with explosives, Governor Jared Polis declared the largest boulder would be named Memorial Rock as a memorial landmark and left where it came to rest; the highway would be rebuilt and rerouted slightly at a cost of over $1 million. The governor stated he hoped it would become a tourist attraction, and the state would be seeking a matching designation and funding from the U.S. Federal Government.

References

 
Landslides in 2019
Individual rocks
Landslides in the United States
Tourist attractions in Montezuma County, Colorado
2019 in Colorado